This is a list of members of the Victorian Legislative Council between 1988 and 1992. As half of the Legislative Council's terms expired at each periodic election, half of these members were elected at the 1985 state election with terms expiring in 1992, while the other half were elected at the 1988 state election with terms expiring in 1996.

 Rod Mackenzie formed a party called the Geelong Community Alliance, which stood candidates (including himself) at the 1992 election.

Sources
 Re-member (a database of all Victorian MPs since 1851). Parliament of Victoria.

Members of the Parliament of Victoria by term
20th-century Australian politicians